Desulfococcus biacutus is a Gram-negative and strictly anaerobic bacterium from the genus of Desulfococcus which has been isolated from anaerobic digestor sludge in Germany.

References

Further reading

External links 
Type strain of Desulfococcus biacutus at BacDive -  the Bacterial Diversity Metadatabase

Desulfobacterales
Bacteria described in 1991